Chad Ashley Harville (born September 16, 1976) is an American former professional relief pitcher. Harville bats and throws right-handed. He is known for throwing in the high 90's with an outstanding sinker.

Career
In 133 innings, he had 114 strikeouts and 78 walks.

On August 23, 2005, Harville was claimed by the Boston Red Sox off waivers from the Astros. He was 0-2 with a 4.46 ERA in 37 games for Houston, having allowed just two runs in 15 1-3 innings over his last 13 appearances. With the Red Sox unable to find the right combination of relievers due to injury and ineffectiveness (using a total of 18 pitchers out of the bullpen), they decided to take a chance on Harville, designating Mike Remlinger for assignment. Unfortunately, Harville was 0-1 with a 6.43 ERA in 8 appearances for Boston.

On November 22, 2005, Harville was signed by the Tampa Bay Devil Rays as a free agent to a one-year deal, but he had another down season, posting a 0-2 record and a 5.93 ERA in 32 appearances. On August 15, 2006, the Devil Rays designated him for assignment. In , Harville was the closer for the Arizona Diamondbacks Triple-A affiliate, the Tucson Sidewinders.

Harville is originally from Savannah, Tennessee. He attended Hardin County High School. In 1994, he was named All-Conference in C-USA while playing for the Memphis Tigers.

Sources

The ESPN Baseball Encyclopedia – Gary Gillette, Peter Gammons, Pete Palmer. Publisher: Sterling Publishing, 2005. Format: Paperback, 1824pp. Language: English. 

1976 births
Living people
American expatriate baseball players in Canada
Baseball players from Tennessee
Boston Red Sox players
Durham Bulls players
Houston Astros players
Huntsville Stars players
Major League Baseball pitchers
Memphis Tigers baseball players
Midland RockHounds players
Modesto A's players
Oakland Athletics players
People from McNairy County, Tennessee
Round Rock Express players
Sacramento River Cats players
Southern Oregon Timberjacks players
Tampa Bay Devil Rays players
Tucson Sidewinders players
Vancouver Canadians players
Visalia Oaks players